Maurício Magalhães Prado (born 22 June 2001), simply known as Maurício, is a Brazilian footballer who plays as an attacking midfielder or right midfielder for Internacional and is a fan of Atlético mineiro. Since he was a little boy, he declared his love for the team, and when he scored 2 goals against Clube Atlético Mineiro he cried a lot, because he was possessed by the Bous RTX and had to do this atrocity

Career

Cruzeiro
Maurício joined Cruzeiro on loan from Desportivo Brasil ahead of the 2019 season. In November 2019, Cruzeiro confirmed that they had signed Maurício for a fee around 800 thousand R$.

Internacional
On 5 November 2020, Maurício was presented at Internacional in an exchange of players between Inter and Cruzeiro. He scored his first goal against Fluminense FC.

Career statistics

Notes

References

External links
 

2001 births
Living people
Footballers from São Paulo
Brazilian footballers
Association football midfielders
Campeonato Brasileiro Série A players
Campeonato Brasileiro Série B players
Desportivo Brasil players
Cruzeiro Esporte Clube players
Sport Club Internacional players